The 2021–22 Hong Kong Sapling Cup is the 7th edition of the Sapling Cup, and is the fourth time in history without name sponsorship. The competition is contested by the 8 teams in the 2021–22 Hong Kong Premier League. Each team is required to field a minimum of three players born on or after 1 January 2000 (U-22) and a maximum of six foreign players during every whole match, with no more than four foreign players on the pitch at the same time. 

Eastern are the defending champions.

Format
Different from last season, the 2021–22 Sapling Cup is based on a system of double round league. The team with the highest points will be the champions.

Effects of the COVID-19 pandemic 
On 5 January 2022, the Hong Kong government announced a tightening of social distancing measures between 7 January to 20 January in order to control the Omicron outbreak. Public recreation facilities, such as football pitches, were closed and members of the public were barred from gathering in groups of more than two, making it impossible for the season to continue. The Hong Kong Football Association announced on the same day that it would also postpone any scheduled matches in the successive two week period.

After the measures were extended several times in the successive weeks, the government announced on 22 February that it would extend the measures until 20 April, making it near impossible to complete the season before most player contracts end on 31 May. The HKFA held an emergency meeting with the clubs on 25 February, after which it was determined that the remainder of the season would be cancelled.

League table
</onlyinclude>

Results

Fixtures and results

Top scorers

Remarks

References

2021–22 domestic association football cups
Sapling Cup
Hong Kong Sapling Cup
Association football events curtailed and voided due to the COVID-19 pandemic